Lisa Scola Prosek (born March 25, 1958) is a San Francisco Bay Area-based composer and librettist. Among her compositions are two oratorios and seven operas.

Life and career
Scola Prosek was born in New Jersey and raised in Rome. She graduated from Princeton University, where she studied with Milton Babbitt, Edward Cone, Lukas Foss, and Gaetano Giani Luporini. She was commissioned by San Francisco’s Thick House Theater for her operas Daughter of the Red Tzar, Belfagor and Sail the Blue Aegean. Her first operatic composition was Satyricon which premiered in 2002.

She is the recipient of several commissions, grants and awards, including from the Argosy Foundation Contemporary Music Fund, the LEF Foundation, Meet The Composer, Theatre Bay Area, The Hewlett Foundation, the Zellerbach Foundation, and The American Composers Forum.

In addition to her work as a composer, she is principal pianist and General Manager of the San Francisco Composers Chamber Orchestra.

Works

Chamber operas
 The Lariat (2014). Based on The Lariat, a novella by Jaime de Angulo. The first public workshop performance took place at San Francisco's Un-Scripted Theatre in June 2014.
 Daughter of the Red Tzar (2012). Commissioned for Thick House Theater and produced with Art Space Development Corporation and First Look Sonoma.
 Dieci Giorni (2010). Premiered at Thick House in San Francisco and was written in collaboration with composer Erling Wold based on Boccaccio’s Decameron.
 Trap Door (2008). A Chamber video opera. Commissioned by The Lab/Art group. Residency at The Lab, 16th Street, San Francisco. In English, based on one soldierʼs experiences in Iraq. Directed by Jim Cave, video sets by Jakub Kalousek.
 Belfagor (2007). Based on Machiavelliʼs Belfagor. Thick House Theater, San Francisco. Performed as a Video-Opera with chamber orchestra, Martha Stoddard, conducting. Directed By Jim Cave.
 I Quaderni di Leonardo (2006). Opera in Italian, text by the composer, with chamber orchestra, Thick House Theater, San Francisco. Videography by Jakub Kalousek. Jim Cave, Director.
 Satyricon (2002)

Choral works and song cycles

 Libera Me (2006). For Choir and Orchestra: Schola Cantorum San Francisco and the San Francisco Composers Chamber Orchestra, Old First Church, San Francisco.
 En una Noche (2006). For the National Shrine of St. Francis of Assisi, Song cycle for Soprano and Viola, with texts from San Juan de la Cruz.

References

External links

1958 births
20th-century classical composers
21st-century American composers
21st-century classical composers
American classical composers
American women classical composers
American opera composers
Living people
Princeton University alumni
Pupils of Edward T. Cone
Pupils of Lukas Foss
Pupils of Milton Babbitt
Women opera composers
20th-century American women musicians
20th-century American composers
21st-century American women musicians
Classical musicians from New Jersey
20th-century women composers
21st-century women composers